Angelina Ballerina is a children's book series by author Katharine Holabird and illustrator Helen Craig about a fictional mouse (full name Angelina Jeanette Mouseling) who is training to become a ballerina. The first book in the series was published in 1983, and since then there have been over twenty books in the series. The series is set in Chipping Cheddar, a place that is similar to 1920s London, and is inhabited by anthropomorphic mice. The name "Angelina" was inspired by an editor named Angela at Aurum Press.

The books have been adapted by HIT Entertainment into two animated television series: Angelina Ballerina (2001-2003, along with a series of specials that ran until 2006) and the CGI-animated Angelina Ballerina: The Next Steps (2009–2010). It has also been adapted as a touring ballet.

Books

Adaptations
In 2001, Angelina Ballerina, a British animated TV series of 40 fifteen-minute episodes based on the books, was produced by HIT Entertainment in the United Kingdom. The series featured actress Finty Williams as the voice of Angelina, and her mother Judi Dench as Miss Lilly. The series aired on CITV in the United Kingdom and on PBS Kids in the United States, where it was presented by Connecticut Public Television.

A computer-animated revival, Angelina Ballerina: The Next Steps, premiered on PBS stations in September 2009. It is directed by Davis Doi and animated at SD Entertainment. WNET, after purchasing CPTV's production unit, is the producer of the program.

English National Ballet took a live version of Angelina Ballerina called Angelina's Star Performance on tour in autumn 2007.

A second revival was announced in 2015, was to be co-produced by Mattel (who acquired HiT Entertainment in 2012) and 9 Story Media Group. A revival of Barney & Friends was announced at the same time. However, no new information on either revival has been provided since the initial announcement.

References

External links
 Official Katharine Holabird website
 Official Angelina Ballerina TV series website
 Official Angelina Ballerina, The Musical website
 English National Ballet performs Angelina's Star Performance

British children's books
British picture books
Series of children's books
English National Ballet
British novels adapted into plays
British novels adapted into television shows
Children's books adapted into television shows
English-language books
Books about mice and rats
Fictional ballet dancers
Books about families
Children's books about friendship
Female characters in literature
Literary characters introduced in 1983
Book series introduced in 1983
1983 children's books